Wilkes Station was an Antarctic research station established 29 January 1957 by the United States as one of seven U.S. stations established for the International Geophysical Year (IGY) program in Antarctica. It was taken over by Australia on 7 February 1959.

History
Navy personnel from the United States constructed the main part of Wilkes in a period of 16 days in January and February 1957, unloading 11,000 tons of material and supplies. It took a crew of over 100 to erect the station which housed 24 naval personnel and scientists for the next 18 months.

As this was the time of the Cold War, there was considerable concern by the United States and Australia about Russian activity in Antarctica. Wilkes was seen to be strategically located because of its proximity to the south magnetic pole.

Australia assumed custody of Wilkes, which remained the property of the U.S. State Department, in February 1959. Although Australia officially took over the operational command, the remaining US personnel did not take kindly to being under Australian control. Consequently, there was a 'back down' until 1961 when the station came under exclusive ANARE control.

Wilkes had originally been built in 1957 for a two-year period. By 1964 the buildings had become a fire hazard due to fuel seepage, and the station was becoming buried by snow and ice. The new station of Casey Repstat (Replacement Station) was developed on the other, southern, side of Newcomb Bay, about two kilometers across the bay south of Wilkes. It was commissioned in 1969 and Wilkes was closed down.

Current status
Wilkes Station is now almost permanently frozen in ice and is only occasionally revealed during a big thaw every four or five years. Many objects remain embedded in the ice, and visitors are often able to see the remains of the station through the ice.

What remains at Wilkes are a number of barracks buildings known as Clements huts, and the remnants of the semi-cylindrical canvas store buildings known as Jamesway huts.

Clean-up program

Wilkes features a series of storage dumps and a considerable amount of waste resulting from 12 years of occupation, including approximately 7000 fuel and oil drums. In early 1988, the Australian Army's 17th Construction Squadron deployed Lieutenant Andrew Stanner to Wilkes Station, Antarctica in order to develop an environmental clean-up plan to remove, make safe or dispose of a large accumulation of rubbish, fuel in drums, explosives, chemicals and gas cylinders deposited since the late 1950s. The plan was subsequently carried out over a period of years for the Australian National Antarctic Research Expeditions by a series of detachments from the squadron.

Wilkes Station in literature
Ice Station, written by Matthew Reilly, is a fiction thriller loosely based on Wilkes Station.

The Coldest Place on Earth (1969), written by Robert Thompson who led the September 1962 Wilkes-Vostock Traverse, returning to Wilkes in January 1963.

See also
 List of Antarctic research stations
 List of Antarctic field camps
Australian Antarctic Division
Casey Station

References

External links
 
 Australian Antarctic Division
 Wilkes History

Outposts of Antarctica
Australian Antarctic Territory
1957 establishments in Antarctica
1969 disestablishments in Antarctica